Morley is an electoral district of the Legislative Assembly in the Australian state of Western Australia.

Morley existed as an electoral district from 1974 to 1996, and was restored as an electorate name in 2008. Between 1983 and 1989 it was known was Morley-Swan.

The district is situated in the northern suburbs of Perth.

Geography
Situated in the densely populated inner northern suburbs of Perth, the district covers the entirety of the suburbs of Nollamara and Noranda; and parts of Beechboro, Dianella and Morley.

History
Morley was first created for the 1974 state election. At the 1983 state election, it was renamed Morley-Swan with the abolition of Swan. The district reverted to the name Morley at the 1989 state election and was abolished ahead of the 1996 state election.

The district was held by Labor at all times, with the exception of the period between 1991 and 1993, when former Labor MP Frank Donovan sat as an independent. The member at the time of Morley's abolition, Labor MP Clive Brown, went on to represent the newly created seat of Bassendean from 1996 to 2005.

A new district named Morley was created for the 2008 state election following the one vote, one value reforms. The majority of the district's voters came from the abolished seat of Ballajura. Nearly all of the remainder of district's territory formerly belonged to Yokine and Maylands; a small part also came from Bassendean.

The new district was created with a Labor majority of 59.9% to 40.1% versus the Liberal Party. However, Liberal candidate Ian Britza captured the seat at the 2008 state election, overcoming the large notional margin due in part to the candidacy of independent candidate and former MP for Ballajura John D'Orazio, who directed preferences to the Liberal candidate ahead of Labor candidate Reece Whitby.

Members for Morley

Election results

References

External links
 
 WAEC district maps: current boundaries, previous distributions

Electoral districts of Western Australia
Electoral